The SNCASE SE-1210 was an experimental French flying-boat designed and built by SNCASE as a flying scale model of the proposed SE-1200 transatlantic flying boat.

Design and development
Following the end of the Second World War, the French aircraft manufacturer SNCASE proposed a very large, long-range flying boat, the SE-1200, which was intended to carry 125 passengers across the Atlantic Ocean.

To enable aerodynamic tests of the design a flying scale model approximately one-third size was built. The resultant SE-1210 was powered by four  Renault 6Q in-line piston engines. The SE-1210, registered F-WEPI, first flew on 9 June 1948 on the Étang de Berre near SNCASE's factory at Marignane, Marseille. After modification it was passed to the Centre d'essais en vol (CEV) for further testing which continued from December 1948 to April 1949. Following the cancellation of the SE-1200 project, testing of the SE-1210 was abandoned, with it being flown for the last time in March 1951, with the flying boat being scrapped in 1952.

Specification

See also
List of flying boats

References
Notes

Bibliography

 
 
 

SE-1210
1940s French experimental aircraft
Flying boats
Four-engined tractor aircraft
High-wing aircraft
Aircraft first flown in 1948
Four-engined piston aircraft